Marleshwar is a place in Sangameshwar subdivision of Ratnagiri district in the Indian state of Maharashtra. This is a small Shiva Temple which takes about one and a half hours to reach by road. The Temple can be reached by climbing approximately 300-400 steps which are lined with refreshment stalls to keep the climbing pilgrims refreshed. The Shiva Temple is situated inside a cave and has a small viewing platform in its premises from which the magnificent Dhareshwar Waterfalls can be admired. Every year thousands of devotees visit the temple and perform ablutions in the nearby Bav River.. 

Although Marleshwar Temple is most popular for religious beliefs, the location of this site makes it quite popular among thrill seekers. Surrounded by the Sahyadri range and Dhareshwar Waterfalls, this temple has treacherous yet exhilarating pathways and its natural environment make it a nature lover's getaway destination.

A trek through Chiplun to reach Marleshwar Temple is a 3-day trek from Helwak through Chandoli Forest. Since it is not a one-day trek, the destinations are broken down. One the first day, the trekkers may cover Ram Ghal, Bhairav Gad and Patharpunj Village. The second day may include reaching Prachit Gad through the dense Chandoli Forest and Chandel Village. And on the third day, one can cover Kundi Village, Mahimar Gad, and Marleshwar. If the time and occasion call for an unplanned stay at one of the villages, it can become a 4 to 5 day-long exciting adventure.

On the day of  'Makarsankranti' a celebration of the marriage of Marleshwar and Girijadevi takes place. On 'Mahashivratri' and 'Tripuri Poornima' there is a fair. Marleshwar name may have come from Maral village .

Gallery

Ratnagiri district
Tourist attractions in Ratnagiri district